Hof is a former municipality in the old Hedmark county, Norway. The municipality existed from 1838 until 1963 when it was merged into Åsnes Municipality. In 1963 when it was dissolved, the municipality encompassed . The administrative centre was the village of Hof where the old Hof Church is located.

Hof was located in the traditional district of Solør. Hof was bordered by Grue municipality to the south, Asnes municipality to the north, Våler, Nord-Odal, and Stange municipalities to the west, and the Kingdom of Sweden to the east. The eastern part of the municipality was part of the Finnskogen area.

Name
The municipality (originally the parish) was named after the old , since the first Hof Church was built on its ground. The name is identical with the word hof which means "temple" (as in a temple of the old Norse gods).

History
Historically, the prestegjeld of Hof included the main parish plus the sub-parishes of Åsnes and Våler. The whole parish of Hof was established as a municipality on 1 January 1838 (see formannskapsdistrikt law). In 1849, the two northern areas of Hof were separated to form the new municipality of Åsnes og Våler (population: 7,087), which drastically reduced the size of Hof municipality. The split left Hof with a population of 2,913. During the 1960s, there were many municipal mergers across Norway due to the work of the Schei Committee. On 1 January 1963, the municipality of Hof (population: 3,222) was merged into the neighboring municipality of Åsnes (population: 6,750). On 1 January 1969 the Rotberget area (population: 23), which had been a part of Hof until the 1963 merger, was transferred to the neighboring Grue municipality.

Government
The municipal council  of Hof was made up of 19 representatives that were elected to four year terms.  The party breakdown of the final municipal council was as follows:

See also
List of former municipalities of Norway

References

Åsnes
Former municipalities of Norway
1838 establishments in Norway
1963 disestablishments in Norway